See also Gap theorem (disambiguation) for other gap theorems in mathematics.

In computational complexity theory, the Gap Theorem, also known as the Borodin–Trakhtenbrot Gap Theorem, is a major theorem about the complexity of computable functions.

It essentially states that there are arbitrarily large computable gaps in the hierarchy of complexity classes.  For any computable function that represents an increase in computational resources, one can find a resource bound such that the set of functions computable within the expanded resource bound is the same as the set computable within the original bound.

The theorem was proved independently by Boris Trakhtenbrot and Allan Borodin.
Although Trakhtenbrot's derivation preceded Borodin's by several years, it was not known nor recognized in the West until after Borodin's work was published.

Gap theorem 
The general form of the theorem is as follows.
Suppose  is an abstract (Blum) complexity measure.

The theorem can be proved by using the Blum axioms without any reference to a concrete computational model, so it applies to time, space, or any other reasonable complexity measure.

For the special case of time complexity, this can be stated more simply as:
for any total computable function  such that  for all , there exists a time bound  such that .

Because the bound  may be very large (and often will be nonconstructible) the Gap Theorem does not imply anything interesting for complexity classes such as P or NP, and it does not contradict the time hierarchy theorem or space hierarchy theorem.

See also 

Blum's speedup theorem

References 

Theorems in computational complexity theory